Macha (Russian: Мача) is a field of five meteorite craters located 685 kilometers (425 miles) northeast of Yakutsk in the Sakha Republic in Siberia, Russia, ranging from  in diameter.

The two largest craters form the pear-shaped Abram Lake while the remaining three are located to the north. They have been very well preserved.

The craters are the result of the fall of possible iron meteorites at approximately 5300 BCE (Holocene), which would give them an age of about 7,300 years.

See also
List of impact craters on Earth

References

External links
Cruzio crater list
U. Wisc. Green Bay - Impact list
Discovery of the largest impact crater field on Earth

Impact craters of Russia
Holocene impact craters
Landforms of the Sakha Republic
Impact craters of the Arctic